Rhacophorus is a genus of frogs in the shrub frog family (Rhacophoridae) and the related Hylidae make up the true tree frogs. They are found in India, Japan, Madagascar, Africa, and Southeast Asia. Over 40 species are currently recognised.

These frogs have long toes with strong webbing between them, enabling the animals to slow their fall to a glide, a form of arboreal locomotion known as parachuting. They are, therefore, among the anurans commonly known as "flying frogs".

The present genus is closely related to Polypedates, which in former times was often included in  Rhacophorus. Even today, it is not fully resolved in which of these genera "P." feae and the Chinese flying frog ("R." dennysi) properly belong, and the supposedly new species "P. pingbianensis" has turned out to be the same as R. duboisi.

Reproduction
These frogs lay their eggs in aerial foam nests; upon hatching, tadpoles drop to the water under the nest and complete their development there.Some species like Rhacophorus kio will wrap this and cover this foam nest with leaves.

Species
These species are recognised in the genus Rhacophorus:

 Rhacophorus annamensis Smith, 1924 – Annam flying frog
 Rhacophorus baluensis Inger, 1954
 Rhacophorus barisani Harvey, Pemberton, and Smith, 2002
 Rhacophorus bengkuluensis Streicher, Hamidy, Harvey, Anders, Shaney, Kurniawan, and Smith, 2014
 Rhacophorus bifasciatus Van Kampen, 1923
 Rhacophorus bipunctatus Ahl, 1927 (including R. htunwini)
 Rhacophorus borneensis  Matsui, Shimada, and Sudin, 2013
 Rhacophorus calcadensis Ahl, 1927 – Kalakad gliding frog
 Rhacophorus calcaneus Smith, 1924
 Rhacophorus catamitus Harvey, Pemberton, and Smith, 2002
 Rhacophorus edentulus Müller, 1894
 Rhacophorus exechopygus Inger, Orlov, and Darevsky, 1999
 Rhacophorus georgii Roux, 1904
 Rhacophorus helenae Rowley, Tran, Hoang & Le, 2012 – Helen's tree frog
 Rhacophorus hoabinhensis Nguyen, Pham, Nguyen, Ninh, and Ziegler, 2017
 Rhacophorus hoanglienensis Orlov, Lathrop, Murphy, and Ho, 2001
 Rhacophorus indonesiensis Hamidy & Kurniati, 2015
 Rhacophorus kio Ohler & Delorme, 2005 – black-webbed treefrog
 Rhacophorus laoshan Mo, Jiang, Xie, and Ohler, 2008
 Rhacophorus larissae Ostroshabov, Orlov, and Nguyen, 2013
 Rhacophorus lateralis Boulenger, 1883
 Rhacophorus malabaricus Jerdon, 1870 – Malabar gliding frog
 Rhacophorus margaritifer (Schlegel, 1837)
 Rhacophorus marmoridorsum Orlov, 2008
 Rhacophorus modestus Boulenger, 1920
 Rhacophorus monticola Boulenger, 1896
 Rhacophorus nigropalmatus Boulenger, 1895 – Wallace's flying frog
 Rhacophorus norhayatii Chan and Grismer, 2010
 Rhacophorus orlovi Ziegler and Köhler, 2001
 Rhacophorus pardalis Günther, 1858 – harlequin tree frog
 Rhacophorus poecilonotus Boulenger, 1920
 Rhacophorus pseudomalabaricus Vasudevan and Dutta, 2000
 Rhacophorus reinwardtii (Schlegel, 1840) – black-webbed tree frog, green flying frog, Reinwardt's tree frog
 Rhacophorus rhodopus Liu and Hu, 1960 (including R. namdaphaensis, often included in R. bipunctatus)
 Rhacophorus robertingeri Orlov, Poyarkov, Vassilieva, Ananjeva, Nguyen, Sang, and Geissler, 2012
 Rhacophorus spelaeus Orlov, Gnophanxay, Phimminith, and Phomphoumy, 2010
 Rhacophorus subansiriensis Mathew and Sen, 2009
 Rhacophorus translineatus Wu, 1977
 Rhacophorus tuberculatus (Anderson, 1871)
 Rhacophorus turpes Smith, 1940
 Rhacophorus vampyrus Rowley, Le, Thi, Stuart, and Hoang, 2010 – vampire tree frog
 Rhacophorus vanbanicus Kropachev, Orlov, Ninh, and Nguyen, 2019
 Rhacophorus verrucopus Huang, 1983
 Rhacophorus viridimaculatus Ostroshabov, Orlov, and Nguyen, 2013

Phylogeny
The following is a partial phylogeny of Rhacophorus from Pyron & Wiens (2011). Only nine species are included. Rhacophorus is a sister group of Polypedates.

References

External links

Amphibian and Reptiles of Peninsular Malaysia - Family Rhacophoridae

 
Amphibians of Asia
Amphibian genera
Taxa named by Heinrich Kuhl
Taxa named by Johan Conrad van Hasselt